Ahatmilku was a princess of Amurru, who became queen of Ugarit through marriage.

Life
Ahatmilku was a wife of the King Niqmepa of Ugarit and daughter-in-law of Niqmaddu II. She held great wealth and influence.

She supported her youngest son Ammittamru II’s succession to the throne after the death of her husband. She banished two of her sons to Alashiya (Cyprus), when they contested this, but made sure they had sufficient supplies.

Notes

Ugarit
13th-century BC women
Ancient princesses
Ancient Mesopotamian women
Ancient queens consort
Amorite people
13th-century BC people